The Malir River Bridge is to date Pakistan's largest bridge which spans . This bridge was inaugurated by Governor of Sindh Dr Ishrat ul Ibad on Wednesday 4 February 2009. The cost of the bridge is PKR 1.2 billion or USD 14 million funded by the Government of Pakistan. 

To enable construction 42 houses were demolished and the owners were compensated by the government.

References

External links

Bridges in Karachi
Bridges completed in 2009
Bridges in Pakistan